The Boat That I Row is a song written by Neil Diamond. It was first released as the flip-side of his top 20 US hit "I Got the Feelin' (Oh No No)" in 1966 and was later included on his album Just For You. In 1967, it was recorded as a single by Lulu, reaching the top 10 of the UK Singles Chart.

History
By April 29, 1967, Billboard recorded the track's UK chart position at 33, having been at 46 the previous week. Spending a total of 11 weeks on the UK chart, it peaked at #6 on 11 May 1967. It failed to crack the top 100 in the US, stalling at number 115. It reached No. 1 in Canada Oct 7, 1967, for one week.

References

1967 songs
Songs written by Neil Diamond
Lulu (singer) songs
Song recordings produced by Mickie Most
Columbia Graphophone Company singles